Til Ten was an Australian local morning show aired on Network Ten in between 30 January 1989 until 27 December 1991, hosted by Andrew Harwood and Joan McInnes.

Network 10 original programming
Australian variety television shows
1989 Australian television series debuts
1991 Australian television series endings
Television shows set in Victoria (Australia)
English-language television shows